Natasha Terri Tang (born Tang Wing-yung, ; 23 August 1992) is a Hong Kong distance swimmer. At the 2012 Summer Olympics, she competed in the Women's marathon 10 kilometre, finishing in 20th place.

References

1992 births
Living people
Hong Kong female long-distance swimmers
Hong Kong female freestyle swimmers
Olympic swimmers of Hong Kong
Swimmers at the 2012 Summer Olympics
Swimmers at the 2010 Asian Games
Asian Games competitors for Hong Kong